Watch Me may refer to:

Watch Me (horse) (foaled 2016), a French Thoroughbred racehorse
"Watch Me" (Scandal), a television episode
Watch Me, a 2014 autobiography by Anjelica Huston

Music
Watch Me (album), by Lorrie Morgan, 1992
"Watch Me" (Lorrie Morgan song), 1992
"Watch Me" (Bella Thorne and Zendaya song), 2011
"Watch Me (Whip/Nae Nae)", a song by Silentó, 2015
Watch Me, a mixtape by Ronnie Radke, 2013
"Watch Me", a song by Anohni from Hopelessness, 2016
"Watch Me", a song by G-Unit from The Beauty of Independence, 2014
"Watch Me", a song by Jaden Smith from Syre, 2017
"Watch Me", a song by James Brown from Universal James, 1993
"Watch Me", a song by Jay-Z from Vol. 3... Life and Times of S. Carter, 1999
"Watch Me", a song by Labi Siffre, 1972
"Watch Me", a song by Little Brother from The Minstrel Show, 2005

See also
Just watch me (disambiguation)
Look at Me (disambiguation)